The Australian Champion Racehorse of the Year is awarded to the Thoroughbred horse who is voted to be the champion horse within an Australian racing season.  This award is open to all racehorses racing within Australia, regardless of age and sex, and includes overseas performances.

This award originally started as the VRC Award and was renamed Australia's Champion Racehorse in 1982. A separate award was voted on between 1976/77 and 1993/4 by the ARMA with the only variations being Gurner's Lane (1982/3) and Bonecrusher (1986/7). The voting bodies combined from 1993/4.

Winx has won the award four times. Black Caviar and Sunline three times.

* Two awards made in 1982-83 & 1986-87 with ARMA selecting different winner

Other Australian Thoroughbred Awards
Australian Champion Two Year Old
Australian Champion Three Year Old
Australian Champion Sprinter
Australian Champion Middle Distance Racehorse
Australian Champion Stayer
Australian Champion Filly or Mare
Australian Champion International Performer
Australian Champion Jumper
Australian Champion Trainer

References

 
Australian Thoroughbred racing awards